Gaël Malacarne (born 2 April 1986 in Saint-Brieuc) is a French racing cyclist, who last rode for UCI Professional Continental team Bretagne-Séché Environnement.

Palmares
2008
1st Stage 3 Tour du Haut-Anjou
3rd Val d'Ille U Classic 35
2010
1st Stage 7 Tour de Bretagne Cycliste
1st Stage 5 Circuito Montañés
2011
1st Prologue Tour Alsace (TTT)
2012
5th Tour de Normandie

References

1986 births
Living people
French male cyclists